The 2009 Arab Champions League Final was a football match which was played on Saturday, 21  May 2009. It was the 6th final of the Arab Champions League. the final play as home and away matches, and it was contested between Espérance of Tunisia and Wydad Casablanca of Morocco.

Match details
The 2009 Arab Champions League Final will be play home and away matches on 9 May at  Stade Mohamed V, Casablanca, Morocco, on 21  May   at Stade 7 November, Radès, Tunisia.

|}

First Leg

Second Leg

External links
  Espérance Sportive de Tunis Official website
   Wydad Casablanca Official Site

2008-09
UAFA
UAFA
2008–09 in Tunisian football
2008–09 in Moroccan football
Sports competitions in Radès
21st century in Radès